Nicholas D'Agostino Sr. (1910–1996) was a supermarket magnate in New York City. He and his brother Pasquale (1905–1960) were Italian-American immigrants and the founders of D'Agostino Supermarkets, one of New York's historically original and leading grocery chains. The D'Agostino brothers pioneered and popularized the concept of the modern supermarket by providing shoppers the opportunity to do all food shopping under one roof, spanning dairy, produce and frozen foods. At its peak, D'Agostino's operated 26 locations across the New York Metropolitan area, generating over $300 million in annual revenue. D'Agostino paved the way for several of New York's most noteworthy specialty food shopping establishments, such as Balducci's, Citarella and Zabar's.

Family, career, philanthropy
Pasquale and Nicholas D'Agostino emigrated from the mountain village of Bugnara, Italy, arriving separately in New York City as teenagers in the 1920s. Due to their poverty, they skipped high school and instead furthered their education by assisting merchants including their father's fruit-and-vegetable pushcart business. As of 2016, the resulting supermarket chain was still owned and managed by the D'Agostino family. At its peak in the 1990s, after two generations of steady expansion, the chain operated at 26 locations in New York City and adjacent Westchester County, with annual sales exceeding $200 million. His two sons, Stephen and Nicholas Jr., both graduates of the College of the Holy Cross, took the reins, with Stephen serving as the Chief Executive until 1984, after which he went onto lead JTL Corporation, the largest independent Coca-Cola bottling corporation. Nicholas Jr. succeeded his brother and continues to serve as Chairman Emeritus.

Nicholas D'Agostino Sr. embodied the iconic rags-to-riches and American Dream story, and in addition to being a successful businessman, he was widely regarded as a philanthropist. After becoming a multi-millionaire in the United States, D'Agostino funded charities and a host of other projects for the Catholic Archdiocese of New York and in his native Italy. He was a recipient of the B'nai B'rith Anti-Defamation Award (1970) as well as the Horatio Alger Award (1982), whose previous honorees included other "self-made" Americans such as Dwight Eisenhower, Billy Graham, Conrad Hilton, Bob Hope and Ronald Reagan.

D'Agostino died in 1996 at the age of 86. He was survived by his wife Josephine, their three children, Stephen, Nicholas Jr., Loretta (Schmitz), and 17 grandchildren, one of whom later wrote a doctoral dissertation on D'Agostino Supermarkets. The funeral of Nicholas Sr. was held at St. Patrick's Cathedral in Manhattan, in respect to his great philanthropy and activism for the Catholic Church.

References
 
 
 
 
 

1910 births
1996 deaths
20th-century American businesspeople
American company founders
American grocers
Italian emigrants to the United States